Richard Arden-Davis (31 January 1855 – 29 June 1917) was an English first-class cricketer with Middlesex, and Anglican clergyman.

Arden-Davis was born at Malins Lee, Shropshire in 1855. He played cricket for Suffolk from 1877 until 1882, his match for Middlesex in 1881 was his only first-class appearance.
The 1881 Census shows him as being resident at Woodland House School, Woodland Road, Edmonton, Middlesex, and described as a School Assistant (Music).

He eventually went into the Church, and was curate of St. John′s, Worcester until August 1902, when he was appointed vicar of Clevedon, Somerset.

References

English cricketers
Middlesex cricketers
1855 births
1917 deaths